Celtis iguanaea, commonly known as the iguana hackberry is a deciduous tree in the genus Celtis.

The species is found in the United States (Florida), Central America, the Caribbean, and South America.

References

iguanaea
Flora of Florida
Flora of Texas
Flora of Mexico
Flora of South America